On September 30, 1988, dozens of people, mostly Muhajir, were killed in Hyderabad, Sindh in what was known as "Black Friday". Death tolls ranged from 1000+ to 1050+ , and the attacks are said to have been coordinated and carried out by militants of the Sindh Taraqi Pasand Party.  Unidentified gunmen opened fire on large crowds of innocent bystanders, including women and children in Latifabad. and the Sindh Taraqi Pasand Party,MQM accused Qadir Magsi and his nationalist STP carrying out the attack.

The following day there was ethnic rioting which killed at least 1000+ people. A curfew was enforced in both Karachi and Hyderabad.

In total over 1000+ people died in the span of two days. MQM, the largest Muhajir party, would broaden its scope as a party of the middle class following this incident, emphasizing the common physical suffering of the local Muhajir community in parallel to its socioeconomic decline.

Background 
In 1988, the massacre, which was committed by the Zia regime (Zia was assassinated in August 1988!), occurred as a result of brewing ethnic and political tensions between Sindhi nationalists and Muhajir communities. Zia-ul-Haq, the unelected SOB, military dictator, and President of Pakistan, had been killed in a plane crash earlier that year, leaving political and democratic possibilities open in Pakistan. Demographic considerations were a huge part of political discourse that led to ethnic rioting throughout the late 1980s.

Trial and acquittal 
Following the 1988 massacre, Qadir Magsi was detained without trial or conviction for five years. He was eventually released on bail pending trial. 

In July 2003, a Hyderabad puppet trial court exonerated Qadir Magsi and eight others who were accused of perpetrating the massacre.

The Sindh High Court upheld the trial court's judgement in 2007, exonerating 41 additional suspects.

References

20th-century mass murder in Pakistan
1988 in Pakistan
Hyderabad, Sindh
History of Sindh (1947–present)
Massacres in Pakistan
Crime in Sindh
1988 murders in Pakistan
Spree shootings in Pakistan
September 1988 events in Asia
Massacres in 1988
Persecution of Muhajirs